The 2015–16 NHL season was the 99th season of operation (98th season of play) of the National Hockey League (NHL). Thirty teams competed in 82-game regular season schedules from October 7, 2015 to April 10, 2016.

The 2016 Stanley Cup playoffs following the regular season began on April 13 and ended June 12 with the Pittsburgh Penguins winning their fourth Stanley Cup. None of the seven Canadian-based teams qualified for the playoffs; this was the second season in league history that the playoff field consisted of only United States-based teams. The only other time in league history that no Canadian teams qualified for the postseason was in 1970.

League business

Salary cap
In December 2014, commissioner Gary Bettman told teams that he projected the salary cap to increase to at least $73 million for the 2015–16 season, citing the fluctuating value of the Canadian dollar. The cap was ultimately set at $71.4 million.

Rule changes
Rule changes approved by the NHL Board of Governors on June 24, 2015, include:

 3-on-3 overtime: Overtime during the regular season will now have three skaters per side, instead of the 4-on-4 overtime system that had been used since 1999–2000. However, if there are carry-over penalties from the third period to overtime, a side is still guaranteed to have at least three skaters and the man-advantage will be adjusted accordingly (e.g. a 5-on-4 power play at the end of regulation will be converted to a 4-on-3 one at the start of overtime). The Board of Governors implemented 3-on-3 overtime to help decrease shootouts. Jason Garrison of the Tampa Bay Lightning scored the first 3-on-3 overtime goal on October 9, 2015 for a 3-2 victory over the Philadelphia Flyers. 
 Expanded video review with coach's challenge: Video review has been expanded to include a coach's challenge, similar to the system used by the NFL since 1999:
 Like the NFL, each challenge will require the use of a team's timeout. If the challenge is successful, the timeout is restored.
 Teams may only challenge the following situations:
 Whether a goal called on the ice should have been disallowed because the attacking team was offside or interfered with the goaltender;
 Whether a disallowed goal, called on grounds of goalkeeper interference, should instead be overturned because either:
 there was no actual contact between the attacking player and the goalie
 the attacking player was actually pushed or fouled by a defender into the goalie
 the attacking player's position in the crease did not actually impair or impact the goalie's play
 Inside the final minute of regulation, and during overtime, all reviews that would otherwise be subject to the coach's challenge will instead be initiated by the NHL's Situation Room in Toronto
 All reviews that are subject to the coach's challenge will be conducted by the on-ice officials on an ice-level tablet monitor instead of the Situation Room.
 All reviews involving whether the puck entered the net will still be initiated by the Situation Room.
 New faceoff rule: During faceoffs not at center-ice, the player who is on the defensive side of the red line will now be required to put his stick down first. For faceoffs at the center-ice dot, the visiting player will still be the first one to place down his stick. This rule change, giving the attacking team a slight advantage during faceoffs (as opposed to giving this advantage to the home team all the time), is intended to help increase puck-possession time and potentially more goals.

Expansion bids

For the second time since 2000, the league ended a moratorium on potential expansion teams and began accepting bids for potential expansion teams that, if approved, would begin play in the 2017–18 season. During the 2015 offseason, two ownership groups offered bids: Quebecor, which planned on reviving the Quebec Nordiques at a new arena in Quebec City, Quebec, and Bill Foley's Black Knight Sports & Entertainment, which intended to place an expansion team at a new arena in Las Vegas, Nevada. The league concluded the vetting process on September 4, 2015, with a final decision to follow in June 2016.

Media rights
In August 2015, the league announced a six-year deal with MLB Advanced Media (MLBAM) to take over the technical operations of the NHL's in-house digital properties. Under the agreement, MLBAM took over the operations of the NHL's websites, apps, streaming services, and other digital properties starting in January 2016. MLBAM also took over international distribution of the league's digital out-of-market streaming services outside of Canada and Scandinavia. The NHL also took an equity stake of up to 10 percent in BAM Tech, a spin-off of MLBAM's streaming media business. As an aspect of the deal, the U.S. version of NHL Network was also relocated to the facilities of MLB Network. The Canadian version of NHL Network was shut down August 31, 2015.

The re-launch of the league's digital properties under MLBAM occurred in February 2016, with the launch of the new NHL.com website and mobile app following the 2016 NHL All-Star Game. The re-launched NHL GameCenter Live service outside of Canada was re-branded as NHL.tv, while the Canadian service remains branded as Rogers NHL GameCentre Live. Both services were upgraded to utilize a new client on MLBAM architecture with support for 60 FPS streaming. The re-launch of the services, however, was marred by technical issues caused by a malfunctioning content delivery network.

As the result of a lawsuit settlement, the NHL agreed to offer single-team packages for its out-of-market services in the United States. The updated NHL app also offers a downsized out-of-market subscription service known as NHL Premium, which streams the conclusion of each game (final five minutes, plus overtime/shootouts if needed).

In Canada, the Sunday-night Hometown Hockey game of the week on City was moved to Sportsnet. Both Sportsnet and TSN announced plans to produce telecasts of selected national and regional games in 4K ultra high-definition television.

On March 10, 2016, the NHL announced a deal with Yahoo! Sports, in which it will offer free online streaming in the U.S. of up to four out-of-market games per-week. The site will also feature additional NHL content, such as condensed games and highlight showcases. The deal expands upon an ongoing relationship with U.S. rightsholder NBC, as well as a relationship with Major League Baseball to host the MLB.tv Game of the Day stream.

On May 5, 2016, NBC Sports announced that it would provide national radio broadcasts of the 2016 Stanley Cup Finals via NBC Sports Radio. NHL Radio broadcasts had not been heard continent-wide since 2008.

Change in jersey supplier 
On September 15, 2015, the NHL announced that Adidas would replace Reebok as the supplier of all team jerseys beginning in the 2017–18 season.

Coaching changes

(*) Indicates interim.

Arena changes 
 The 2015–16 season marked the New York Islanders' move from the Nassau Veterans Memorial Coliseum in Uniondale to Barclays Center in Brooklyn.
 The Edmonton Oilers played their final season at Rexall Place. They moved to the newly constructed Rogers Place in the 2016–17 season.

Regular season
The regular season began on October 7, 2015, and ended on April 10, 2016. The playoffs began on Wednesday, April 13, 2016.

Winter Classic

The 2016 NHL Winter Classic was held on January 1, 2016. The game, the eighth Winter Classic, saw the Montreal Canadiens defeat the Boston Bruins, 5–1, at Gillette Stadium in Foxborough, Massachusetts, a significant event in one of the NHL's best-known rivalries. A Bruins and Canadiens alumni game was also played on December 31, 2015. The Boston Pride women's professional hockey team played before the alumni game against Les Canadiennes of the Canadian Women's Hockey League to a 1–1 tie in the first ever Women's Winter Classic.

Stadium Series

There were two Stadium Series games planned. The first one featured the Chicago Blackhawks and the Minnesota Wild at TCF Bank Stadium on Sunday, February 21, 2016, where the Wild defeated the Blackhawks 6–1. The other game was the Detroit Red Wings and the Colorado Avalanche at Coors Field on Saturday, February 27, 2016, where the Red Wings defeated the Avalanche 5–3.

All–Star Game

The 61st National Hockey League All-Star Game was held in Nashville, Tennessee at Bridgestone Arena, home of the Nashville Predators, on January 31, 2016. The All-Star Game adopted a new, three-on-three tournament format; there were three 20-minute games, with four All-Star teams based on the league's four divisions. The Atlantic Division All-Stars faced the Metropolitan Division All-Stars, while the Central Division All-Stars played against the Pacific Division All-Stars. The winners of these two games then met in an All-Star Game Final. Had a tie remained after 20 minutes, then it would have immediately gone to a shootout to determine the winner; there would be no standard overtime. The Pacific Division All-Stars, led by fan-voted captain and MVP John Scott, won the tournament, beating the Atlantic All-Stars in the finals

Postponed games
Three games were postponed due to the January 2016 United States blizzard: the Anaheim Ducks–Washington Capitals game originally scheduled for January 22, the Philadelphia Flyers–New York Islanders game originally scheduled for January 23, and the Pittsburgh Penguins–Washington Capitals game originally scheduled for January 24. The Penguins–Capitals game was rescheduled for March 1, while the Ducks–Capitals and Flyers–Islanders games were rescheduled for April 10.

Standings

Tie Breakers:
1. Fewer number of games played.
2. Greater Regulation + OT Wins (ROW)
3. Greatest number of points earned in head-to-head play (If teams played an unequal No. of head-to-head games, the result of the first game on the home ice of the team with the extra home game is discarded.)
4. Greater Goal differential

Player statistics

Scoring leaders
The following players led the league in regular season points at the conclusion of games played on April 10, 2016.

Leading goaltenders
The following goaltenders led the league in regular season goals against average at the conclusion of games played on April 10, 2016, while playing at least 1800 minutes.

Playoffs

Bracket

NHL awards

Awards were presented at the NHL Awards ceremony, to be held following the 2016 Stanley Cup playoffs. Finalists for voted awards are announced during the playoffs and winners are presented at the award ceremony. Voting will conclude immediately after the end of the regular season. The Presidents' Trophy, the Prince of Wales Trophy and Clarence S. Campbell Bowl are not presented at the awards ceremony. The Lester Patrick Trophy is announced during the summer and presented in the fall.

All-Star teams

Milestones

First games

The following is a list of notable players who played their first NHL game during the 2015–16 season, listed with their first team.

Last games

The following is a list of players of note who played their last NHL game in 2015–16, listed with their team:

Major milestones reached
On November 21, 2015, San Jose Sharks forward Patrick Marleau scored his 1,000th career point, becoming the 83rd player in league history to reach this milestone.
On November 27, 2015, Arizona Coyotes coach Dave Tippett won his 500th game, becoming the 22nd coach in league history to reach this milestone.
On December 19, 2015, Pittsburgh Penguins forward Phil Kessel played his 500th consecutive game, becoming the 23rd player in league history to reach this milestone.
On January 4, 2016, Colorado Avalanche forward Jarome Iginla scored his 600th NHL goal, becoming the 19th player in league history to reach this milestone.
On January 10, 2016, Washington Capitals forward Alexander Ovechkin scored his 500th NHL goal, becoming the 43rd player in league history to reach this milestone.
On January 14, 2016, Chicago Blackhawks coach Joel Quenneville won his 783rd game, surpassing Al Arbour to become the second coach with most wins in league history.
On January 21, 2016, Vancouver Canucks forward Daniel Sedin scored his 347th NHL goal, surpassing Markus Naslund for most goals in franchise history.
On January 26, 2016, San Jose Sharks forward Joe Thornton scored his 1,300th career point, becoming the 33rd player in league history to reach this milestone.
On February 4, 2016, Florida Panthers forward Jaromir Jagr scored his 1,100th career assist, becoming the sixth player in league history to reach this milestone.
On February 13, 2016, Boston Bruins coach Claude Julien won his 500th game, becoming the 23rd coach in league history to reach this milestone.
On February 20, 2016, Florida Panthers forward Jaromir Jagr scored his 742nd career goal, surpassing Brett Hull to become third in career goals.
On March 7, 2016, Florida Panthers forward Jaromir Jagr scored his 1,851st career point, surpassing Gordie Howe to become third in career points.
On March 14, 2016, Los Angeles Kings goaltender Jonathan Quick recorded his 41st career shutout, surpassing both Frank Brimsek and John Vanbiesbrouck to become the all-time shutout leader for U.S.-born goaltenders.
On April 2, 2016, Dallas Stars coach Lindy Ruff won his 700th game, becoming the fifth coach in league history to reach this milestone.
For the first time in the history of the NHL, Canadian-born players do not comprise a majority the league's players. Of the 680 players who appeared in games over the course of the first two weeks of the season, 49.7 percent were born in Canada, while 24.2 percent were American-born. A record 9.1 percent were from Sweden, and 4.5 percent from Russia.

Uniforms
The Anaheim Ducks made a minor change to their home jersey. They changed the collar laces from black to white. The team also unveiled their new third jersey; the jersey shows a modern Ducks re-colouring of the old Mighty Ducks of Anaheim logo used from the 1993–94 season to the 2005–06 season. The jersey is primarily orange with black and bronze striping. On both shoulders it features the team's current primary logo and on one side of the collar it features the team's wordmark "ANAHEIM". 
The Arizona Coyotes began using new home and away jerseys. The primary logo stays the same. The jerseys have added a large black stripe on each arm running from just below the shoulder to the elbow. From there it is red-white-red before it runs white right to the cuff. There's a single hem stripe, black on homes and red on the whites. The home red features a new shoulder patch, a beige/sand coyote paw print with a black "A" on it. The road white features a modernized "AZ/map" patch, with the font updated to match the new team wordmark. The pants are black, socks are red, black and white similar to the striping on each arm. The new home and away jerseys replace the home and away jerseys that the Coyotes unveiled last year.
The Boston Bruins unveiled their new 2016 NHL Winter Classic uniform. The jersey is based on their jersey they wore during the 1924-25 season. The colors have been modernized as black is the primary color, gold and brown as the secondary colors. Two gold horizontal stripes are on each arm and one across the waist. The "Boston" wordmark arched over an illustrated bear and Bruins, the crest varies only slightly in the layout from the 1924-25 original. The crest colors celebrate both the beginning and modern day color palette of this historic franchise, and are executed in felt and chenille materials, similar to the original crest. The numbers are in your standard jersey semi-serif block lettering, names and numbers are in white or cream. The numbers on the sleeves are located between the two gold horizontal stripes. The 2016 Winter Classic logo appears on one shoulder as a patch.
The Buffalo Sabres have scrapped their alternate jersey that was unveiled for the 2013-14 season. In lieu of a third jersey, with special permission from the league, the team will wear their white away jerseys for six home games in this season.
The Chicago Blackhawks unveiled a unique jersey for their 2016 NHL Stadium Series game. This jersey is primarily white with black/red/black stripes on the sleeves and socks. The current logo is on the chest. Framed between the two black stripes and over the red stripe on the sleeve is the familiar "C" with crossed tomahawks. The collar of the jersey features two different colors. The four, six-pointed red stars from the Flag of Chicago is featured on the white portion of the collar, while the other side of the collar is black. Sleeve numbers have been shifted to the shoulders and enlarged. With the shoulders being black, the numbering is white. But, the numbering and lettering on the back is also enlarged and black in color.
The Colorado Avalanche will replace their "Sasquatch" alternate logo by a re-coloured "CO" from the State of Colorado flag. A new third jersey features the logo of the long-departed Colorado Rockies, set in Avalanche colors and number font. In addition to that, they're marking their 20th anniversary with a patch on the front of their jerseys.
The Avalanche will also wear a special jersey, which will be primarily white with black, red and blue also featured for the 2016 NHL Stadium Series. It incorporates the same Colorado 'C' design that was added to the Avalanche jersey designs earlier this year. It also features larger numbers on the back and on the shoulders. The collar features a "5280" call out, referencing the Avalanche's home in the Mile-High City.
The Columbus Blue Jackets altered their home and road jerseys slightly. The blue Union Army cap shoulder patch worn from the 2003–04 season until the 2014–15 season was replaced with a new shoulder patch logo. The new shoulder patch logo features the 1857 Napoleon cannon. It is very similar to the club's current third jersey logo, with the only difference is that the logo features the club's primary colors – Navy Blue, Red, Silver and White.
The Detroit Red Wings unveiled a unique jersey for their 2016 NHL Stadium Series game. This jersey is primarily red with a diagonal white stripe across the chest. Featured inside the diagonal white stripe is the large red redesigned "D" logo. The current Red Wings logo is featured on one shoulder and the 2016 Stadium Series logo is featured on the other shoulder. The word "EST 1926" is written on the inside rear collar and the word "RED WINGS" is written on one side of the front collar. The jersey also features large numbers on the back and on the shoulder as well as a nameplate featuring arched lettering which is all white in color.
The Edmonton Oilers unveiled a new alternate jersey. This new throwback jersey is a remake of the jersey worn by the franchise during their inaugural season as the Alberta Oilers of the World Hockey Association. The jersey is orange with blue and white shoulders and blue/white/blue stripes on the sleeves. The numbers are in the same location as the original WHA jersey on which they are based.
The Minnesota Wild unveiled a unique jersey for their 2016 NHL Stadium Series game. This jersey is primarily green with red and beige stripes on the sleeves. Beige is also featured on the shoulders. The current logo is on the chest. On the left shoulder is their "State of Hockey" logo and on the right shoulder is the 2016 Stadium Series logo. The numbering and lettering which are beige in color are enlarged on the sleeve and on the back of the jersey. 
The Montreal Canadiens made some slight alterations to their home and away jerseys. Four brass hexagonal eyelets and white laces will be reintroduced around the collar, which will also revert to pure white in color. On the team's red home jersey, the French "LNH" logo will be stitched at the nape of the neck, and the lone exception to the English "NHL" on the away jersey. It is very similar to the club's home and away jerseys worn from the 1970–71 season to the 1974–75 season. The new home and away jerseys replace the home and away jerseys worn from the 2007–08 season until the 2014–15 season.
The Montreal Canadiens unveiled their 2016 NHL Winter Classic jerseys. The chest stripe is a shade of blue. The "C" is white and the "H" is red, as they were in 1923-24. An image of the globe is on the sleeves that closely resembles the 1925 version. The French "LNH" logo will be stitched near the collar. Other features included into the design are a red collar, red letters, red numbers and red stripes. 
The Nashville Predators added the 2016 NHL All-Star Game logo as their patch on the front of their jerseys. They hosted it on January 31, 2016.
The Nashville Predators normally wear blue helmets with their gold home jerseys, but this season they'll switch to gold helmets for Saturday home games.
The New York Islanders unveiled a new alternate jersey. This New Jersey is in black with white trim, with blue and orange relegated to the back collar. The "NY" wordmark from the Stadium Series thirds was moved to the new alternates, sans the chrome accents. The new third jersey replaces the Stadium Series third jerseys the Islanders wore in the 2014–15 season.
The New York Islanders added a patch on the right shoulder of the jerseys commemorating their first season in Brooklyn. In addition to that, they have also added a left shoulder "Al" patch in memory of former coach Al Arbour who died on August 28, 2015, at the age of 82.
The San Jose Sharks added a 25th anniversary patch. The patch features a new, "swimming" Shark with an exposed tail hovering above a diamond-encrusted "25".
The San Jose Sharks unveiled their "heritage jersey." This design is identical to the road jerseys worn from 1991-92 season through 1997-98 season, adapted to the Reebok Edge uniform system. 
The Washington Capitals added a new alternate jersey to their lineup. The primary color for the uniform is red and closely resembles the team's jersey worn from 1974–75 season through 1994–95 season. The original Capitals wordmark is featured on the front of the jersey with six stars above it and five stars beneath the numbers on each sleeve. The Capitals will wear blue pants and red helmets with their third jerseys. The new third jersey replaces the white third jersey the Capitals wore from the 2011–12 season to the 2014–15 season.

See also
2015–16 NHL transactions
2015–16 NHL suspensions and fines
2015–16 NHL Three Star Awards
2016 NHL playoffs
2015 in sports
2016 in sports

References

External links
2015–16 NHL season Schedule

 
1
1